Foundations of Algebraic Geometry is a book by  that develops algebraic geometry over fields of any characteristic. In particular it gives a careful treatment of intersection theory by defining the local intersection multiplicity of two subvarieties.

Weil was motivated by the need for a rigorous theory of correspondences on algebraic curves in positive characteristic, which he used in his proof of the Riemann hypothesis for curves over a finite field.

Weil introduced abstract rather than projective varieties partly so that he could construct the Jacobian of a curve. (It was not known at the time that Jacobians are always projective varieties.) It was some time before anyone found any examples of complete abstract varieties that are not projective.  
 
In the 1950s Weil's work was one of several competing attempts to provide satisfactory foundations for algebraic geometry, all of which were superseded by Grothendieck's development of schemes.

References

External links
Extracts from the preface of Foundations of Algebraic Geometry

1946 non-fiction books
Algebraic geometry
Mathematics books
History of mathematics